Satellite Wonderland the fourth EP by Australian band Horsell Common. It was released on 25 September 2006

Track listing
"You" – 2:52
"Blood & Wine" – 3:35
"Royal Artillery" – 2:49
"Stop...Don't Stop" – 3:32
"Satellites" – 4:48

Charts

Personnel
Mark Stewart – vocals, guitar
Luke Cripps – bass guitar
Leigh Pengelly – drums

References

2006 EPs
Horsell Common albums